During the 1901–02 Scottish football season, Celtic competed in the Scottish First Division.

Results

Scottish First Division

Inter City League

Scottish Cup

References

Celtic F.C. seasons
Celtic